József Berényi (born 6 June 1967) is a Hungarian minority politician from Slovakia. He was the Chairman of the Party of the Hungarian Coalition of Slovakia in 2010-2016.

Biography
From 1994 to 1995, Berényi was a researcher for The New School. In 1995, he became a foreign political secretary for Fidesz. Later, he served as an advisor to the Minister of Construction and Region Development and Director of the Regional Development Department of Slovakia. In 2002, Berényi became State Secretary of the Ministry of Foreign Affairs. 

Berényi is married with two children.

References

Members of the National Council (Slovakia) 2006-2010
Party of the Hungarian Community politicians
Comenius University alumni
Central European University alumni
1967 births
Living people
People from Dunajská Streda District
Hungarians in Slovakia